The Director of Russia's Federal Security Service (Директор Федеральной Службы Безопасности) is the head and chief executive officer of the Federal Security Service, which is one of several Russian intelligence agencies. The Director of FSB reports directly to the president of Russia. The Director is assisted by the Deputy Director of the FSB.

The Director is a civilian or a general of the armed forces nominated by the President, with the concurring or nonconcurring recommendation from the Secretary of the Security Council of Russia and must be confirmed by a majority vote of the Federation Council.

List

Ministry of Security (1992 – 1993) / Federal Counterintelligence Service (1993 – 1995)

Federal Security Service (since 1995)

References

FSB
Federal Security Service